Joliette is a federal electoral district in Quebec, Canada, that has been represented in the House of Commons of Canada from 1867 to 1935 and since 1968.

Geography
This electoral district, located northeast of Montreal in the Quebec region of Lanaudière, currently consists of:
the Regional County Municipality of Matawinie, including Communauté Atikamekw de Manawan indian reserve
the Regional County Municipality of Joliette.

It is bounded by the:
 electoral district of Repentigny and Berthier—Maskinongé and the Saint Lawrence River to the south
 electoral district of Saint-Maurice—Champlain to the east and north
 Lac Nemiscachingue and the electoral districts of Rivière-du-Nord, Montcalm and Laurentides—Labelle to the west

History
It was created by the British North America Act of 1867 which preserved existing electoral districts in Lower Canada. In 1933, Joliette became part of the new electoral district of Joliette—L'Assomption—Montcalm.

It was created again in 1966 from Berthier—Maskinongé—delanaudière, Joliette—L'Assomption—Montcalm and Terrebonne ridings.

This riding lost territory to Berthier—Maskinongé during the 2012 electoral redistribution.

Members of Parliament
This riding has elected the following Members of Parliament:

Election results

1968–present

Note: Conservative vote is compared to the total of the Canadian Alliance vote and Progressive Conservative vote in the 2000 election.

			
Note: results from the 1974 federal election are missing from the Library of Parliament website.  Results shown are incomplete results (250 of 256 polling stations reporting) reported in the Globe and Mail on 9 July 1974.

Note: percentage change for Roch LaSalle compares his vote as a PC candidate in 1974 to his vote as an independent candidate in 1972.

Note: Social Credit vote is compared to Ralliement créditiste vote in the 1968 election.

Note: percentage change for Roch LaSalle compares his vote as an independent candidate in 1972 to his vote as a PC candidate in 1968.

1867–1935

|-

| style="width: 160px"|Nationalist
|Hilaire Neveu
|align=right|?
|align=right|
|align=right|
|-

N.B. Mr. Guilbault elected by the casting vote of the Returning Officer.

Note: The change in Mr. Guilbault's popular vote is compared to his result in the 1882 general election.

See also
 List of Canadian federal electoral districts
 Past Canadian electoral districts

References

Campaign expense data from Elections Canada
Riding electoral history from Parliament of Canada website:
Joliette, Quebec (1867–1933)
Joliette--L'Assomption--Montcalm (1933-1966)
Joliette (1966-present)
Riding History - Joliette
Atlas of Canada

Notes

Quebec federal electoral districts
Joliette